XHHE-FM is a radio station on 105.5 FM in Atotonilco El Alto, Jalisco. It carries the La Z format.

History
XEHE-AM 1460, a 250-watt daytimer, received its concession on June 29, 1959. In the 1990s, it moved to 940 kHz and increased power to 1,000 watts. It migrated to FM in 2011.

References

Radio stations in Jalisco